Grégory Rosec (born 18 March 1977) is a retired French para table tennis player who competed in international elite events. He is a double Paralympic bronze medalist and a double European champion in team events. After retirement, he became the head coach of the French para table tennis team.

References

1977 births
Living people
Sportspeople from Le Havre
Paralympic table tennis players of France
Table tennis players at the 2000 Summer Paralympics
Table tennis players at the 2004 Summer Paralympics
Table tennis players at the 2012 Summer Paralympics
Medalists at the 2004 Summer Paralympics
Medalists at the 2012 Summer Paralympics
French male table tennis players
20th-century French people
21st-century French people